Jim Preuitt  (born July 19, 1935) is a former Democratic member of the Alabama Senate, representing the 11th District since 1995. Previously he was a member of the Alabama House of Representatives.

On November 13, 2007, the body of his grandson (missing for eight days) was found in Villa Rica, Georgia.

In April 2010 Preuitt left the Democratic Party becoming a Republican.

References

External links
Alabama State Legislature - Senator Jim Preuitt official government website
Project Vote Smart - Senator Jim Preuitt (AL) profile
Follow the Money - Jim Preuitt
2006 2002 1998 campaign contributions

Alabama state senators
Democratic Party members of the Alabama House of Representatives
1935 births
Living people
American members of the Churches of Christ
People from Lawrence County, Alabama
Alabama Republicans